Matthew Hoffman is an American television personality, host, Broadway investor and narrator. Hoffman was born on Long Island, New York.  He is best known for being the narrator and co-writer of Love Island USA for over 125 episodes on CBS and Netflix and Laid Bare on Paramount+.

He has also served as an on-screen personality, correspondent, or host for television programs such as ABC News, Extra, and the 63rd Annual Grammy Awards, along with interview shows such as Regal Cinemas’ “Sit Down with the Stars.” He is the co-creator, series producer and host of Previously On; The Official Love Island USA Podcast With Matthew Hoffman produced by ITV America and Peacock. He was termed as the voice and soul of Love Island US. He is the co-creator and Host of Love Notes, a weekly radio show for Amazon Amp.

Early life and education 
Hoffman was raised on Long Island, New York and graduated with a BFA in Musical Theater from The Boston Conservatory.

Career

Television hosting

Love Island USA/CBS 
In 2019, Hoffman was chosen to be the official voice, narrator and co-writer of the inaugural season of the American version of Love Island. It was announced he would return for the second season in August 2020.

On May 13, 2021, Hoffman hosted and moderated a live discussion regarding the CBS Reality Summer Slate through the social app Clubhouse. Hoffman interviewed Julie Chen Moonves, and Arielle Vandenberg, with the three announcing that both shows would premiere on July 7, exclusively on CBS. He returned for the show’s third season in 2021.

He serves as a co-writer on the show. Hoffman also provided narration for the show’s spinoffs on Paramount+.
Hoffman made an appearance at an open casting call for Love Island hosted by the ECHL hockey team Orlando Solar Bears on March 4, 2020.

ABC 
In 2016, Hoffman hosted the segment "The Greatest Interview Ever with Matthew Hoffman" on ABC News’ People’s List, which starred Jerry O'Connell.
From 2019-2021,  Hoffman served  as a celebrity commentator for "The Year: with Robin Roberts" on ABC produced by ABC News, which aired on ABC and streamed on Hulu.

Award shows 
Hoffman hosted the red carpet pre-show at the 34th Independent Spirit Awards in 2019.

In 2021, Hoffman announced the Billboard Music Awards’ off-air winners during the award show’s off-air award ceremony broadcast on Instagram Live. Hoffman was the official host and of The 2021 Mastercard Grammy live preshow.

EXTRA 
Since 2018, Hoffman has served as a special correspondent for Extra. In 2021, Hoffman interviewed Keanu Reeves live from the Castro Theater in San Francisco at the world premiere of “The Matrix: Resurrections” as a special correspondent for Extra.

FOX / Fran Drescher Talk Show 
In 2010 Hoffman was the official correspondent on The Fran Drescher Tawk Show airing on Fox stations.

NBC Universal / E! 
In 2009, Hoffman was a correspondent on That Morning Show for E!.

Hoffman was also one of the hosts of the digital series You Know That Scene for Focus Features.

Hoffman hosted Focus Features Trivia Night for NBC Universal. The 2021 season was recognized with a Clio shortlist award.

Various Hosting 
Since 2015, Hoffman hosted the interview show "Sit Down With The Stars" for Regal Movies.

In 2021, Hoffman served as the official voice and co-writer of the Caesars Entertainment promotions. Hoffman also hosted the game show The Games We Play for Lionsgate. Hoffman was also the official voice of the TikTok special "Nostalgia".

Miscellaneous Credits 
In 1996 and 1997, Hoffman performed as Young Scrooge in A Christmas Carol at Madison Square Garden opposite Tony Randall and Ben Vereen. Jesse Eisenberg was his understudy.

Theatre Investing 
Hoffman is an investor in Magic Mike Live, as well as KPOP, The Broadway Musical.

Philanthropy 
Hoffman has been volunteering weekly since 2010 and his volunteer program "Tuesdays With Matthew" has raised thousands of meals for Meals On Wheels America. In March 2020, Hoffman raised over $12,000 for Meals On Wheels COVID outreach. His volunteer work was profiled on the cover of The New York Times “Sunday Styles” section.

Credits

Television

Theater

References 

Year of birth missing (living people)
Living people